Forensic footwear evidence can be used in legal proceedings to help prove that a shoe was at a crime scene. Footwear evidence is often the most abundant form of evidence at a crime scene and in some cases can prove to be as specific as a fingerprint. Initially investigators will look to identify the make and model of the shoe or trainer which made an impression. This can be done visually or by comparison with evidence in a database; both methods focus heavily on pattern recognition and brand or logo marks. Information about the footwear can be gained from the analysis of wear patterns which are dependent on angle of footfall and weight distribution. Detailed examination of footwear impressions can help to link a specific piece of footwear to a footwear imprint as each shoe will have unique characteristics.

Types of footwear evidence

Footwear evidence can come in at least three forms, footwear outsole impressions, footwear insole impressions and footwear trace evidence.

Footwear outsole impressions
Footwear outsole impressions are impressions left on an object that was caused by contact with a piece of footwear. These can be left on the ground or raised surface by persons treading over it, left on doors or walls by persons attempting to kick or climb over a wall or even left on other persons after being kicked or stomped on.

There can also be latent impressions not easily visible to the naked eye, on many different surfaces such as floor tiles, concrete or even carpet. Detection may require the use of additional specialized light sources such as portable ultraviolet lighting. Recovery typically includes photography as well as lifting with "gel" or "electrostatic" dust lifters.

Footwear insole imprints
Imprints of a person's foot can be left on the insole (inside) of footwear. Due to the sweat and dirt from the foot the insole impression can be left regardless of the wearers foot being in a sock or other covering.  The size and arrangement of foot and toe imprints can be used to determine whether a person has worn a piece of footwear. The analysis and comparisons of foot imprints is part of the discipline of forensic podiatry. The insole will show a virtual image of the bare foot print of the wearers foot. This can be compared to the actual barefoot print of the shoe owner to gain a match. A 3d optical surface scan can then be used to build up a model of the foot itself.    Useful in forensic evidence casting and identification. H Farmer BSc Hons Fs 2018

Footwear trace evidence
Footwear trace evidence is trace evidence that is recovered from footwear. Types of trace evidence that could be recovered include skin, glass fragments, body hair, fibers from clothing or carpets, soil particles, dust and bodily fluids. The study of this trace evidence could be used to link a piece of footwear to a location or owner. DNA can be one of the contributing factors in forensic footwear evidence.

Detection of footwear evidence

Footwear impressions can be detected with a variety of methods including:
Visually using natural or artificial lighting. 
Using artificial light sources to provide oblique, coaxial, and polarized light for detection of visible and latent impressions.
Using electrostatic lifting devices to lift dusty impressions.
Using fingerprint powder to develop latent impressions.
Using physical or chemical enhancement methods to develop or enhance faint impressions.

Recovery of footwear impression evidence
Footwear evidence occurs most often as either footwear impressions left in a soft surface, such as mud, or as dust deposits, which are difficult for the human eye to detect. At violent crimescenes footmarks can be left as a result of a person standing in blood and subsequently trailing it as they move around the scene.

Lifting

Footwear impressions can be lifted from surfaces with tools such as adhesive lifters, gelatin lifters or electrostatic lifting devices.

Casting

Evidence left via impressions can generally be recovered utilizing a plaster cast. Initially the impression is isolated by framing the area with a solid boundary. Following this a plaster mix can be gently poured inside the frame; it is generally considered not best practice to pour directly onto the impression. In some cases where the surface is not ideal for casting prior techniques can be utilised to gain a better cast of the impression. Sand can often be fixed in place by applying an aerosol resin or glue although hair spray is often used. Wet mud impressions can be dried using a combination of pipetting water from the surface and applying hot air, often in the form of a hair dryer.

3D Optical Surface Scanning 
Footwear evidence can be recovered with use of 3D scanners.

There are two types of 3D scanners used in forensics:
 crime scene scanners able to capture a large overview map of the scene; 
 ‘close-up’ 3D scanners able to capture individual objects in high resolution and full colour.
Advantage of 3D scanning over casting is that 3D scanners can scan the object without touching or affecting it – most 3D scanners use lasers to capture 3D information. Some scanners can also capture the colour surface, [null producing] a visually [null accurate] replica of the object. To create a complete and highly detailed 3D model of a footprint less than 15 minutes is required. HF 2018

Three-dimensional imaging 
Recent approach takes advantage of digital photography. A set of digital images of a footmark or target area of interest, taken in different viewpoints is required to create detailed and accurate 3D model. Appropriate software allows to visualise a 3D model in different ways, make accurate measurements from a 3D trace or perform a comparison of multiple traces.

Examination of footwear impressions evidence
Footwear impression can reveal information that may be of use to forensic investigators. Analysis of impressions found at a crime scene may provide the following information:

Number of people at a crime scene: Different footwear impressions left at a crime scene will indicate more than one person was present at the crimescene.

Approximate height of the wearer: There is statistical correlation between foot/footwear size and height and also stride length and height.  The dimensions of the footwear impression and the distance between impressions can be used to provide an estimate of height. 

Activity of wearer when impression was made: Plastic footwear impression left on soft surfaces can reveal whether a person was walking, running or carrying a heavy load when the impression was made. An impression made by person running will make impressions that are deeper in the heel and toe sections. A person carrying a heavy load such as a body will leave imprints that are deeper than when not carrying a heavy load.

Manufacture, model and approximate size of footwear: Footwear impression can show the design elements (shapes, patterns, arrangement)  that form the outsole design. These can be compared with a footwear outsole database to identify the model of footwear that made the impression. Knowledge of the model of footwear that made the impression can assist in narrowing down the list of suspects and can also be used to link multiple crime scenes to the same perpetrator(s).

Establish link between crime scene impression with a specific piece of footwear:
Comparison of crime scene impressions with a specific piece of footwear recovered from a suspect can determine if there is any relationship. A worn piece of footwear will gradually acquire unique wear and tear on the outsoles. These randomly acquired characteristics will be unique to that specific shoe and may show in crime scene impressions. 
 If class characteristics and size matches: investigators can determine that footwear could have made the impression, but other footwear with similar design and size could also have made the impression. 
 If class characteristics, size match and randomly acquired characteristics found in the footwear outsole can also be found in the crime scene impressions:  Investigators can determine that the specific piece created the crime scene impression. This relationship can be used as evidence to prove that the footwear's owner was at the crime scene.

Limitations of footwear evidence
The Unabomber, Theodore Kaczynski, was known to keep shoes with smaller soles attached to the base in order to confuse investigators about the size of the suspect's feet.

There is a lack of scientific research and evidence to support footprint evidence in criminal investigations and convictions. While footwear evidence has appeared to be useful in some high-profile cases, such as Richard Ramirez’s (aka The Night Stalker) unique ‘Avia’ shoeprints helped investigators link together his crimes, it must be evaluated cautiously. In the Ramirez case the footwear impressions used to link his crimes were not the primary evidence used to convict him of his crimes. There have been cases where footprint evidence has assisted in wrongful conviction, such as Charles Irvin Fain who was wrongfully convicted and sentenced to death row. The forensic investigator testified that the shoe prints found at the crime scene matched the ‘walking gait’ of Fain, though analysis of this type has never been scientifically validated. Fain was later exonerated based on DNA evidence after almost 18 years on death row. 

It must also be considered that footprints discovered at a crime scene remain fixed, while the wearer of the footwear continues on likely changing the wear of the shoe. Thus, unless the print is immediately matched its potential value may be lost. Also of concern is the lack of science and standards demonstrating that footwear marks are unique. There are a lack of scientific studies demonstrating how many characteristics are needed to determine a match with such evidence. This is similar to other forensic evidence such as bite mark analysis, tire tread analysis, etc. where there is little scientific evidence of its efficacy. In 2009, the National Academy of Sciences made the conclusion that, aside from DNA, there was little if not any, scientific evidence for many forensic disciplines, including footprint evidence.

Footwear databases
Forensic investigators can use computerized footwear databases to quickly compare the class characteristics such as tread design and possibly identify a manufacturer, brand, and model to the ones stored in the database.
Everspry
Forensity
Foster and Freeman
PRIDE
Raven technologies

Footwear Software 
DigTrace

High profile cases

See also
Digital footprint

References

External links

Scientific Working Group on Shoeprint and Tire Tread Evidence (SWGTREAD)

Footwear
Footwear evidence